Quanesha Burks (born March 15, 1995) is an American track and field athlete who mainly competes as a long jumper. She represented her country at the 2015 Pan American Games and the 2017 World Championships in Athletics. She was the gold medalist at the regional 2015 NACAC Championships in Athletics. Collegiately, she competed for Alabama Crimson Tide and was the 2015 NCAA Division I champion in long jump.

Career
Born to Lesha Dobbins in Ozark, Alabama, she attended Hartselle High School and went on to study at University of Alabama. Burks has four younger siblings; two brothers and two sisters. While a high school student, she took up track and performed well, going on to place third in the triple jump at the 2012 USATF Junior Olympics and winning a 100-meter dash/long jump/triple jump triple at the 2013 state championships.

College
Burks competed for the Alabama Crimson Tide where she was a multiple-time Southeastern Conference champion and multiple-time NCAA champion, including being Alabama's first women's long jump champion.  In college, she also competed in the 100 meter dash and 4x100 relay. Her first NCAA long jump title came at the 2015 NCAA Division I Outdoor Track and Field Championships. She was runner-up to Jamaica's Chanice Porter at the 2016 NCAA Outdoor Championships and also took second at the 2017 NCAA Division I Indoor Track and Field Championships after Sha'Keela Saunders.

Professional
Burks made her international debut at the age of nineteen, competing in the long jump at the 2014 World Junior Championships in Athletics, where she placed fifth. A senior gold medal came at the 2015 NACAC Championships in Athletics, where she set the championship record at 6.93 m. She managed eighth place in the final at the 2015 Pan American Games, but took a second regional gold at the 2016 NACAC Under-23 Championships in Athletics, breaking the championship record with a jump of 6.74 m. After a fourth place finish at the 2017 USA Outdoor Track and Field Championships, her global senior debut came at the 2017 World Championships in Athletics, though she did not make it beyond the qualifying round.

She was third at the 2018 PSD Bank Meeting on the IAAF World Indoor Tour, then finished second to Brittney Reese at the 2018 USA Indoor Track and Field Championships to earn qualification to the 2018 IAAF World Indoor Championships where she finished 4th.

International competitions

National titles
NCAA Outdoor Championships
Long jump: 2015

Personal life
Burks grew up in poverty. She worked at McDonald's as a high school student to help pay for her grandmother's car insurance.

References

External links

Living people
Track and field athletes from Alabama
People from Ozark, Alabama
American female long jumpers
Pan American Games track and field athletes for the United States
Athletes (track and field) at the 2015 Pan American Games
World Athletics Championships athletes for the United States
African-American female track and field athletes
Alabama Crimson Tide women's track and field athletes
1995 births
USA Indoor Track and Field Championships winners
Athletes (track and field) at the 2020 Summer Olympics
Olympic track and field athletes of the United States
21st-century African-American sportspeople
21st-century African-American women